Jason Tompkins is a British actor from Wigston. He is most famous for his role as Robert Greenspan, one of the main characters in the dark comedy series Psychoville. He also had a notable role in an episode of Jonathan Creek, as well as a minor role in an episode of The 10th Kingdom.

References

External links

British male television actors
Actors with dwarfism
Living people
Year of birth missing (living people)